1972 Soviet Second League was a Soviet competition in the Soviet Second League.

Qualifying groups

Group I [Ukraine]

Group II [Soviet Northwest]
 [3-1-0 point system]

Group III [Russia and Georgia]

Group IV [Russian South and Caucasus]

Group V [Volga and Soviet Turkestan]

Group VI (Siberia and Kazakhstan)
 [3-1-0 point system]

Group VII (Far East)

Promotion playoffs

Final Group 
 [Nov 4-18, Sochi]

Additional play-off 
 [Nov 22, 25]
 SPARTAK Ivano-Frankovsk  0-1 3-1  Daugava Riga

References
 All-Soviet Archive Site
 Results. RSSSF

Soviet Second League seasons
3
Soviet
Soviet